Kristinestad (Sweden ;) is a town and a municipality in Finland. It is located in the western part of Finland on the shore of the Bothnian Sea. The population is bilingual with a majority speaking Swedish and the minority Finnish. The town was chartered in 1649 by Per Brahe the Younger at Koppö island and is named for Queen Christina of Sweden. Kristinestad is known for its old town with low wooden houses and narrow alleys.
In April, 2011, Kristinestad became Finland's first Cittaslow community.

Geography

Climate 

Kristinestad has a continental subarctic climate (Dfc).

International relations

Twin towns — Sister cities
Kristinestad is twinned with:

 Sala, Sweden
 Novello, Italy

Gallery

See also 
 Jakobstad
 Kaskinen

References

External links 

Official website 
Kristinestad 1649–1999. One of the best preserved wooden towns in Fenno-Scandinavia

Cities and towns in Finland
Populated coastal places in Finland
Municipalities of Ostrobothnia (region)
Grand Duchy of Finland
Populated places established in 1649
1649 establishments in Sweden